Guglielminetti is an Italian surname. Notable people with the surname include:

Amalia Guglielminetti (1881–1941), Italian poet and writer
Ernest Guglielminetti (1862–1943), Swiss medical doctor

Italian-language surnames